Leslie Warren Cox (August 14, 1904 – October 14, 1934) was an American professional baseball player. A pitcher, he appeared in two games in Major League Baseball in 1926 for the Chicago White Sox.

Cox died at age 30 of complications after undergoing an appendectomy.

References

Major League Baseball pitchers
Chicago White Sox players
Palestine Pals players
Petersburg Broncos players
San Antonio Bears players
Des Moines Demons players
Springfield Senators players
Milwaukee Brewers (minor league) players
Oklahoma City Indians players
Texas Longhorns baseball players
Baseball players from Texas
1904 births
1934 deaths
People from Junction, Texas
Deaths from appendicitis